Bergvall is a Swedish surname. Notable people with the surname include:

Agne Bergvall (born 1962), Swedish athletics coach
Bjørn Bergvall (born 1939), Norwegian sailor
Erik Bergvall (1880–1950), Swedish water polo player, journalist and sports official
Helga Bergvall
Joel Bergvall, Swedish filmmaker
John Bergvall (1892–1959), Swedish politician
Sven Bergvall (1881–1960), Swedish actor
Thure Bergvall (1887–1950), Swedish long-distance runner

See also
Meanings of minor planet names: 8001–9000#695

Swedish-language surnames